The Constitution of Guatemala is the supreme law of the Republic of Guatemala. It sets the bases for the organization of Guatemalan government and it outlines the three main branches of Guatemalan government: executive branch, legislative branch, and judicial branch.

History
For the current Constitution of the Republic it is necessary to know its history, which is as follows:

1824: Decreed on November 22, 1824, the Constitution of the Federal Republic of Central America by the National Constituent Assembly, the first in Central America.
1825: Promulgating the October 11, 1825, the first Constitution of the State of Guatemala, also entering into force the same year.
1879: Promulgating the 11 December 1879, the Constitutive Act of the Republic of Guatemala, the second of Guatemala and the first of the Republic, also having several reforms throughout its term .
1921: Promulgating the September 9, 1921 the Constitution of the Federal Republic of Central America (which includes the states of Guatemala, El Salvador and Honduras ) and enters into force on 1 October 1921 the Constitution of 1921, this being the second in Central America. 
1945: Adopted on March 11, 1945, and comes into force on March 15, 1945, the Constitution of 1945. 
1956: Adopted on 2 February 1956 and entered into force on 1 March 1956 the Constitution of 1956. 
1965: Adopted on September 15, 1965, and comes into force on May 5, 1966, the Constitution of 1965. 
1985: Adopted on 31 May 1985 and comes into force on January 14, 1986, the current Constitution of the Republic of Guatemala by the National Constituent Assembly .
1993: Reform the Constitution on 17 November of that year, after the overthrow of then President of the Republic of Guatemala Jorge Antonio Serrano Elias.
1999: A referendum is done to reform the Constitution again, said reform bill not approved by such consultation .

Provisions

The Constitution of the Republic of Guatemala of 1985 is legally divided into three parts:
 Dogmatic Part: Article 1 to Article 139. Considered the most important part of the charter, these articles enumerate the fundamental rights and freedoms.
Organic Part: Article 140 to Article 262. These articles establish the Organization of the State and the State Agency, which are:  As well as autonomous and decentralized entities
Procedural, pragmatic or practical part: Guarantees the mechanisms established to enforce the rights enshrined in the Constitution, in order to defend the constitutional order.

Preamble
The preamble to the current Constitution of the Republic is:
Calling on the name of God

We, the representatives of the people of Guatemala, elected freely and democratically, meeting in National Constituent Assembly in order to organize legally and politically the State; affirming the primacy of the human person as the subject and purpose of social order; recognizing the family as the primary and fundamental genesis of the spiritual and moral values of society and the State, responsible for promoting the common good, the consolidation of the regime of legality, security, justice, equality, freedom and peace; inspired by the ideals of our ancestors and picking up our traditions and cultural heritage; determined to promote the full enjoyment of human rights within a stable, permanent and popular institutional order, where rulers and ruled proceed with absolute adherence to the law.

We Solemnly Decree,
Sanction and Promulgate
The Following:
Constitution of the Republic of Guatemala

Structure

Title I: The human person, purpose and duties of the State (arts. 1–2)
Chapter One (arts. 1–2)
Title II: Human Rights (arts. 3–139)
Chapter I: Individual Rights (arts. 3-46)
Chapter II : Social Rights (arts. 47–134)
Section One : Family
Section Two: Culture
Section Three: Indigenous Communities
Section Four: Education
Section Five: Universities
Section Six: Sport
Section Seven : Health, Safety and Welfare
Section Eight : Work
Section Nine : State Workers
Section Ten : Economic and Social Regime
Chapter III : Duties and Civil and Political Rights (arts. 135–137)
Chapter IV : Limitation of Constitutional Rights (arts. 138–139)
Title III: The State (arts. 140–151)
Chapter I: The State and its form of government (arts. 140–143)
Chapter II : Nationality and Citizenship (arts. 144–148)
Chapter III : International Relations of the State (arts. 149–151)
Title IV: Public Power (arts. 152–222)
Chapter I: exercise of public authority (arts. 152–156)
Chapter II: Legislative Branch (sections 157–181)
Section One: Congress
Section Two: Powers of Congress
Section Three: Training and Punishment Act
Chapter III: Executive Agency (arts. 182–202)
Section One: President of the Republic
Section Two: Vice President
Section Three: Ministers of State
Chapter IV: judiciary (arts. 203–222)
Section One: General Provisions
Section Two: Supreme Court
Section Three: Court of Appeal and other courts
Title V: Structure and Organization of the State (arts 223–262)
Chapter I: Political Election System (arts. 223)
Chapter II: Administrative Regime (arts. 224–231)
Chapter III: Board of Control and Supervision (arts. 232–236)
Chapter IV: Financial Regime (arts. 237–243)
Chapter V: Army (sections 244–250)
Chapter VI: Public Ministry and Attorney General's Office (arts. 251–252)
Chapter VII: Municipal Regime (arts. 253–262)
Title VI: Constitutional Guarantees and Defense of the Constitutional Order (arts. 263–276)
Chapter I: Personal Exhibition (arts. 263–264)
Chapter II : Amparo (art. 265)
Chapter III : Unconstitutionality of Laws (arts. 266–267)
Chapter IV : Court Constitutionality (arts. 268–272)
Chapter V : Commission and Ombudsman for Human Rights (arts. 273–275)
Chapter VI : Law on Amparo, Habeas Corpus and Constitutionality (art. 276 )
Title VII: Amendments to the Constitution (arts. 277–281)
Chapter One (arts. 277–281)
Title VIII: Transitional and Final Provisions (arts. 1 to 27)
Chapter One : Transitional and Final Provisions (arts. 1 to 27)

Amendment Process
The Constitution of the Republic of Guatemala is mixed class, as may be amended part by the Congress of the Republic of Guatemala and elsewhere by the National Constituent Assembly. The Constitution of the Republic of Guatemala to be reformed is based from Article 277 to Article 281 of the same supreme law.

Methods of Reform
Initiatives to propose reforms to the Constitution:

 The President of the Republic in Council of Ministers
 Ten or more deputies to the Congress of the Republic
 The Constitutional Court
 The people by petition to Congress, not less than five thousand citizens duly registered by the Register of Citizens

In any of the above cases, Congress must address the matter raised without any delay.

Constitutional Principles

Principle of the supremacy of the Constitution 
Article 44 last paragraph
Article 175
Article 204

Principle of hierarchy
Article 9 of the Judiciary Act
1. National Constituent Assembly
The Constitution of the Republic of Guatemala
The Law on Amparo, Habeas Corpus and Constitutionality
The Public Order Act
Electoral and Political Parties Law
Law of Thought
2. Legislative Branch
Decrees of the Congress of the **Republic of Guatemala
Civil Code
Penal code
Civil and Commercial Code
Criminal Procedure Code
Work code
Commercial Code of Guatemala
Municipal code
3. Common and Statutory Law
Governmental Agreements created by the President of the Republic of Guatemala, autonomous institutions and decentralized
4. Individualized
Are the resolutions, contracts or judgments that affect a person or group of determined persons.

Law initiative
Article 174 of the Constitution says that for the formation of the legislation lies with the following institutions :
The Congress of Guatemala .
The Executive Agency.
The Supreme Court of Justice.
The University of San Carlos of Guatemala.
The Supreme Electoral Tribunal.

Autonomous bodies regulated in the Constitution
Central National School of Agriculture (Article 79)
University of San Carlos of Guatemala (Article 82)
Autonomous Sports Confederation of Guatemala and the Guatemalan Olympic Committee (Article 92)
Guatemalan Institute of Social Security (Article 100)
Monetary Board (Articles 132–133)
Municipalities (Article 253)

Human Rights classes

1. Rights of the First Generation
Individual ( Civil ) : Arts. 3-46 .
Civic and Political Arts. 135-139 .
2. Second Generation Rights
Social and Cultural Arts. 47-134 .
3. Rights of the Third Generation
Environmental Rights
Information Rights : Art . 44 .
International Treaties

See also

Politics of Guatemala
Guatemala
List of political parties in Guatemala

References

External links

 Constitution of 1985 issued on 30 May 1985, which entered into effect on 14 January 1986 —Courtesy of Global Legal Information Network
 Constitution of 1966 issued on 15 September 1965, which entered into effect on 5 May 1966 —Courtesy of Global Legal Information Network
 Constitution of 1956 issued on 2 February 1956, which entered into effect on 1 March 1956 —Courtesy of Global Legal Information Network
 Constitution of 1945 issued on 11 March 1945, which entered into effect on 15 March 1945 —Courtesy of Global Legal Information Network
 Constitution of the Second Federal Republic of Central America of 1921, which included the States of Guatemala, El Salvador, and Honduras, promulgated on 9 September 1921, which entered into force on 1 October 1921 —Courtesy of Global Legal Information Network
Constitución de Guatemala. Full text from Wikisource. (in Spanish)

Guatemala
Law of Guatemala